CH, Ch, cH, or ch may refer to:

Arts and entertainment
 Television channel (sometimes abbreviated as "ch." for television and cable stations)
 Chaos;Head, a video game
 Clone Hero, a clone game version of popular rhythm game series Guitar Hero.
 CollegeHumor, a comedy website
 E!, a defunct Canadian television system that went by the name CH from 2001 to 2007

Businesses
 Bemidji Airlines (IATA code CH)
 Carolina Herrera, a fashion designer based in New York
 Columbia Helicopters, an aircraft manufacturing and operator company based in Aurora, Oregon, United States

In language
 Ch (digraph), considered a single letter in several Latin-alphabet languages
 Chamorro language: ISO 639 alpha-2 language code (ch)

Science and technology

Chemistry
 The methylidyne radical (a carbyne); CH• (or •CH), CH3• (or ⫶CH) 
 The methylidyne group ≡CH
 The methine group (methanylylidene, methylylidene) =CH−

Mathematics and computing
 Chomsky hierarchy, in computer science, a containment hierarchy of classes of formal grammars
 Continuum hypothesis, in set theory
 Hyperbolic cosine, in mathematics, a hyperbolic function, ch(x) = cosh(x)
 Curry–Howard correspondence, the relationship between computer programs and mathematical proofs
 CH register, the high byte of an X86 16-bit CX register
 Ch (computer programming), a cross-platform C/C++ interpreter
 Contraction hierarchies, in computer science, a speed-up technique for finding shortest paths in a graph

Medicine
 Cluster headache
 Cholesterol
 Congenital hypothyroidism, a condition of thyroid hormone deficiency present at birth
 Cerebellar hypoplasia, characterized by reduced cerebellar volume
 Cerebellar hypoplasia (non-human)
 French catheter scale, a scale for medical catheters, also abbreviated as Fr

Military technology
 Cargo helicopter (U.S. military helicopter alpha-numeric prefix)
 Chain Home, a World War II radar array
 Heavy cruiser (U.S. Navy ship code CH, standing for "Cruiser, Heavy")

In other sciences
 Clay of high plasticity (USCS soil type CH)
 Cassini-Huygens

Places
 Confoederatio Helvetica, the formal name for Switzerland, Latin in origin
 ISO country code for Switzerland
 .ch, the Internet country code top-level domain for Switzerland
 CH postcode area; the Chester postcode area in the UK 
 Chihuahua (state), the State of Chihuahua, Mexico
 Conservation Halton, in Ontario, Canada
 China (FIPS and NATO country code CH)

Other uses
 Chain (length), a unit of linear measure in the Imperial system
 Championship (dog), a dog qualifying for a championship at a conformation show, prefixed "Ch."
 Christ's Hospital, Horsham, West Sussex
 Companion of Honour, a British and Commonwealth honour
 Chaudhary, an honorific used in the Indian and Pakistani Punjab regions
 Metres above the Sea (Switzerland), an elevation reference system
 The logo for the Montreal Canadiens ice hockey team